The Auburn–Tulane football rivalry is an American college football rivalry between the Auburn Tigers and Tulane Green Wave. The rivalry began in 1902. Tulane leads the series 17–15–6.

Series history
The first game took place on October 25, 1902, in New Orleans, Louisiana. Both teams played in the Southern Intercollegiate Athletic Association (SIAA) until leaving in 1922 to form the Southern Conference. Tulane and Auburn were charter members of the Southeastern Conference (SEC) in 1932 and played annually until 1955. The rivalry was renewed in 2006. The rivalry was notable for its back-and-forth nature, featuring three straight scoreless ties from 1936–38.

Notable games

1926: A safety beats Tulane at Sugar Bowl dedication
The most notable game of Dave Morey's tenure as Auburn head coach was a 2–0 win over Bernie Bierman's Tulane squad, in the game that dedicated New Orleans' famous Sugar Bowl.

1932: Hitchcock upsets Green Wave
Led by All-American Jimmy Hitchcock, Auburn upset the Green Wave 19–7. It was called by one sports editor "the most glamorous football conquest in the annals of Auburn football." Hitchcock scored first when he intercepted a pass from Tulane's All-American, Don Zimmerman, and ran 60 yards for a touchdown, with the key block provided by Dave Ariail. The second touchdown was a 63-yard run from Hitchcock out of a punt formation.

1955: Tulane upsets #8 Auburn
In the last matchup until 2006, Gene Newton threw two touchdowns in a 27–13 upset of 8th ranked Auburn.

Game results

See also  
 List of NCAA college football rivalry games

References

College football rivalries in the United States
Auburn Tigers football
Tulane Green Wave football